In enzymology, a taurine-transporting ATPase is an enzyme that catalyzes the chemical reaction.

ATP + H2O + taurineout  ADP + phosphate + taurinein

The 3 substrates of this enzyme are ATP, H2O, and taurine, whereas its 3 products are ADP, phosphate, and taurine.

This enzyme belongs to the family of hydrolases, specifically those acting on acid anhydrides to catalyse transmembrane movement of substances. The systematic name of this enzyme class is ATP phosphohydrolase (taurine-importing).

References

Further reading 

 

EC 3.6.3
Enzymes of unknown structure